Goodnight is a surname. Notable people with the surname include:

 Charles Goodnight (1836–1929), 19th century American cattle baron
 Clarence J. Goodnight (1914–1987), American zoologist 
 G. Thomas Goodnight, American argumentation and rhetorical scholar
 Isaac Goodnight (1849–1901), American politician from Kentucky
 James Goodnight, American businessman

Fictional characters
 Mary Goodnight, a character in James Bond novels and films